Comilla Zilla School is a boys' school in Comilla, a city in Bangladesh. It is one of the oldest schools in the country. It was the only school in Comilla when it was established in 1837.

History 
The school, in the center of Comilla town, was established on 20 July 1837 by the Englishman Henry George Leicester. It was set up by the government of British India for teaching English literature and science and named Comilla Zilla School. In the beginning, there were only 37 students. From 1857, the school was running under Kolkata University. In the 1850s, the school academic building was expanded and more facilities were created to make it a full-fledged high school. The school is situated on 5.69 acres.

Current Day

Initially the school conducted only one shift. From 1991 two shifts were introduced: morning and day. Presently all the classes from 5 to 10 are running. There are six sections in each of the classes: 'A', 'B', 'C', and 'A', 'B' and 'C' for class six to ten where 'A', 'B' and 'C' are in morning shift and day shift.

There are 60 students in each of the sections. For class nine and ten, students are distributed into four sections following the same structure with a larger number of students in a class. Almost 2,000 students are studying in the school with 53 teachers.

There are four buildings, a Shaheed Minar and a hostel for the students. There is also a library and a common room.

Extracurricular activities 
 Bangladesh National Cadet Corps (BNCC)
 Red Crescent
 Sports (athletics, cricket, badminton, basketball, swimming, and football)
 Debating
 Scouting
 Cultural activities
 Math and language competitions
 Science fair
 Study tour
 Participates in the Bangladesh Mathematical Olympiad annually
 Participates in the Bangladesh Physics Olympiad annually
 Participates in Bangladesh Junior Science Olympiad annually
 Chess tournaments

Facilities
These school has three academic buildings, an administrative building and two hostels. There is a big field in the school arena, as well as a basketball court . Other facilities include mosque, workshop, auditorium, canteen, shaheed minar, and library. There are 53 teachers and 20 staff. The school has five laboratories and a computer lab.

Achievements
The school is known for the quality of education. Less than 10% of the total applicants are admitted.

Among schools under the Board of Intermediate and Secondary Education, Comilla, the school ranked first numerous times on Secondary School Certificate (SSC) examination.

Notable alumni
 Asif Akbar, is a Bangladeshi pop singer
 Apel Mahmood,  is a Bangladeshi singer and freedom fighter. He is one of the performers of Swadhin Bangla Betar Kendra during the Liberation War of Bangladesh in 1971 and best known for the song Mora Ekti Phulke Bachabo Bole Juddho Kori
 A.B.M. Khairul Haque, former Chief Justice of Bangladesh
 AKM Azizul Haque, an advisor to the Ministry of Agriculture.
 Dhirendranath Datta, Bengali lawyer who was active in the politics of undivided Bengal in pre-partition India and later in East Pakistan (1947–1971)
 Enamul Haque Moni, former Bangladeshi cricketer who played in 10 Tests and 29 ODIs from 1990 to 2003
 Gazi Mazharul Anwar,  is a Bangladeshi film director, producer, lyricist, screenwriter and music director.
 General Iqbal Karim Bhuiyan, former Chief of Army Staff of Bangladesh
 Himangshu Dutta, a music composer in the Bengali music industry
 Kamrul Ahsan, Bangladesh Ambassador to Russia, Secretary to the Government, career foreign service officer and former High Commissioner of Bangladesh to Canada and Singapore
 Muhammad Anwar Hossain, 2nd Lt. (1-E Bengal), first Shaheed defense officer during Bangladesh Liberation War, later awarded as Bir Uttom by Bangladesh Government
 Piash Karim, sociologist and political commentator
 Sachin Dev Burman, former Indian music director and singer. A member of the Tripura royal family, he started his career with Bengali films in 1937. Later he began composing for Hindi movies, and became one of the most successful and influential Bollywood film music composers.
 Shib Narayan Das, a leading student leader of late 1960s who designed the first national flag of Bangladesh
 Syed Mahmud Hossain, current Chief Justice of Bangladesh

See also
 List of Zilla Schools of Bangladesh
 List of Educational Institutions in Comilla

References

External links
 http://czs.edu.bd/
 https://www.czsspc.com/

Schools in Comilla District
High schools in Bangladesh
1837 establishments in India
Boys' schools in Bangladesh
Educational institutions established in 1837